2001 Istanbul suicide bombing may refer to:

January 2001 Istanbul bombing
September 2001 Istanbul bombing